Dascylium or Daskylion  or Daskyleion (Δασκυλεῖον) was a town in ancient Caria, mentioned by Stephanus of Byzantium. Stephanus relates that it was founded after the Trojan War.

Its site is unlocated.

References

Populated places in ancient Caria
Former populated places in Turkey